The 1947 St. Bonaventure Bonnies football team, sometimes also referred to as the St. Bonaventure Brown Indians, was an American football team that represented St. Bonaventure University during the 1947 college football season. In its second season under head coach Hugh Devore, the team compiled a 6–3 record and outscored opponents by a total of 174 to 84. The team played its home games at Forness Stadium in Olean, New York.

Schedule

References

St. Bonaventure
St. Bonaventure Brown Indians football seasons
St. Bonaventure Bonnies football